David Roy Peoples (born January 9, 1960) is an American professional golfer who has played on the PGA Tour and Nationwide Tour.

Early life and amateur career
Peoples was born in Augusta, Maine.  He accepted an athletic scholarship to attend the University of Florida in Gainesville, Florida, where he played for coach John Darr and Coach Lynn Blevins' Florida Gators men's golf team in National Collegiate Athletics Association (NCAA) competition in 1980 and 1981.

Professional career
Peoples turned professional in 1981.  He had two PGA Tour victories, and his highest position on the year-end money list was 25th in 1992.

Professional wins (3)

PGA Tour wins (2)

Other wins (1)

Results in major championships

Note: Peoples never played in The Open Championship.

CUT = missed the half-way cut
"T" = tied

See also

1982 PGA Tour Qualifying School graduates
1983 PGA Tour Qualifying School graduates
1985 PGA Tour Qualifying School graduates
1986 PGA Tour Qualifying School graduates
1987 PGA Tour Qualifying School graduates
1989 PGA Tour Qualifying School graduates
1995 PGA Tour Qualifying School graduates
1999 PGA Tour Qualifying School graduates
List of Florida Gators men's golfers on the PGA Tour

References

External links

American male golfers
Florida Gators men's golfers
PGA Tour golfers
Golfers from Maine
Golfers from Orlando, Florida
Sportspeople from Augusta, Maine
1960 births
Living people